Apostrophe (') is the fifth solo studio album and eighteenth in total by Frank Zappa, released in March 1974 in both stereo and quadraphonic formats. An edited version of its lead-off track, "Don't Eat the Yellow Snow", was the first of Zappa's three Billboard Top 100 hits, ultimately peaking at number 86. The album itself became the biggest commercial success of Zappa's career, reaching number 10 on the US Billboard 200.

Overview
Apostrophe (') remains Zappa's most commercially successful album in the United States. It was certified gold by the RIAA on April 7, 1976 and peaked at number 10 (a career-high placement) on the Billboard 200 chart in 1974. Continuing from the commercial breakthrough of Over-Nite Sensation (1973), this album is a similar mix of short songs showcasing Zappa's humor and musical arrangements. The record's lyrical themes are often bizarre or obscure, with the exception of "Uncle Remus", which is an extension of Zappa's feelings on racism featured on his earlier song "Trouble Every Day".

Music
The first half of the album loosely follows a continuing theme. "Don't Eat the Yellow Snow" and "Nanook Rubs It" tell of a dream the singer had where he saw himself as an Eskimo named Nanook. It continues into "St. Alfonzo's Pancake Breakfast," which Zappa said was inspired by a television commercial for Imperial margarine.

As was the case with many of Zappa's albums, Apostrophe (') was a melange of archival and recent recordings; side one of Apostrophe (') (1974) and Over-Nite Sensation (1973) were recorded simultaneously. The tracks on side two originate from various 1972 sessions with overdubs recorded in 1973 and 1974, except for "Excentrifugal Forz", where the drum track (played by Johnny Guerin) originally came from the Hot Rats sessions in 1969 (along with the bass and drum tracks for "Lemme Take You to the Beach" on Studio Tan (1978) and Läther (1996), although in the case of "Excentrifugal Forz" this is not actually noted in either the album liner notes or official correspondence), and "Stinkfoot", where the basic track, possibly originally known as "The Bass & Drums Song", dates from the Chunga's Revenge sessions in early 1970.

"Apostrophe (')" is an instrumental featuring bassist Jack Bruce and session drummer Jim Gordon, who was on tour with Zappa's band at the time of the session in November 1972. Bruce is credited on the album cover with bass guitar and co-writing the title song. However, in an interview for Polish rock magazine Tylko Rock he said that he had not played any bass guitar parts or done any co-writing on "Apostrophe (')", only the cello intro. He reminisced, "So I turned up in a NY studio with my cello, I'm listening to [Zappa's] music, pretty awful, and just don't know what to do with myself, and Frank [Zappa] says to me: "Listen, I would like you to play a sound, like this... whaaaaaang!!!" So I did what he asked me to do. Whaaaaaang!!! That was all. That was my input to Frank Zappa's most popular record! [laughs]" Bruce had studied the instrument at the Royal Scottish Academy of Music and Drama and performed with it on some of his other recordings.

However, Zappa has referred to Bruce playing bass on the track in an interview: "Well, that was just a jam thing that happened because he was a friend of (drummer) Jim Gordon. I found it very difficult to play with him; he's too busy. He doesn't really want to play the bass in terms of root functions; I think he has other things on his mind. But that's the way jam sessions go."

Release and reception

Village Voice critic Robert Christgau wrote in his review: "Disillusioned acolytes are complaining that he's retreated, which means he's finally made top ten, but that's just his reward for professional persistence. If anything, the satire's improved a little, and the title piece—an improvisation with Jack Bruce, Jim Gordon, and rhythm guitarist Tony Duran—forays into quartet-style jazz-rock. Given Frank's distaste for 'Cosmik Debris' you'd think maybe he's come up with something earthier than Mahavishnu, but given his distaste for sex you can be sure it's more cerebral instead."

Apostrophe (') and Over-Nite Sensation, recorded with the same group of musicians, are the subject of a Classic Albums series documentary from Eagle Rock Entertainment, released on DVD May 1, 2007.

In July 2016, the Zappa Family Trust released a CD of alternate mixes, different takes and live versions of material from Apostrophe (') titled The Crux of the Biscuit. It includes early versions of "Down in De Dew", which Zappa considered for Apostrophe (') but later included on Läther.

Track listing

Personnel

Musicians
 Frank Zappa – vocals, guitar, bass, bouzouki
 Sal Marquez – trumpet
 Ian Underwood – saxophone
 Napoleon Murphy Brock – saxophone
 Bruce Fowler – trombone
 Don "Sugarcane" Harris – violin
 Jean-Luc Ponty – violin
 Ruth Underwood – percussion, vibraphone
 George Duke – keyboards
 Tony Duran – rhythm guitar
 Harper May – bass guitar
 Erroneous (Alex Dmochowski) – bass guitar
 Jack Bruce – bass on "Apostrophe'" (see controversy presented above)
 Ralph Humphrey – drums (side one)
 Johnny Guerin – drums on "Excentrifugal Forz"
 Aynsley Dunbar – drums on "Uncle Remus" and "Stink-Foot"
 Jim Gordon – drums on "Apostrophe"

Back-up vocals 

Lynn (Linda Sims)
Robert "Frog" Camarena 
 Ruben Ladron de Guevara 
Debbie (Debbie Wilson)
 Ray Collins 
 Sue Glover 
Kerry McNabb 
George Duke
Napoleon Murphy Brock
 Tina Turner (uncredited)

Production staff
 Cal Schenkel – artwork, graphic design
 Barry Keene – engineer
Kerry McNabb –  engineer, remixing
 Ferenc Dobronyi – cover design
 Bob Ludwig – technician
 Paul Hof – technician
 Oscar Kergaives – technician
 Brian Krokus – technician
 Mark Aalyson – photography
 Bob Stone – transfers, digital remastering
 Steve Desper – engineer
 Terry Dunavan – engineer
 Zach Glickman – marketing
 Bob Hughes – engineer

Charts

References

External links
Lyrics and information
Release details

1974 albums
Albums produced by Frank Zappa
DiscReet Records albums
Frank Zappa albums
Albums recorded at Electric Lady Studios
Albums recorded at Bolic Sound